Euchlorostola is a genus of moths in the subfamily Arctiinae. The genus was described by Watson in 1980.

Species
 Euchlorostola anusia Schaus, 1924
 Euchlorostola corydon Druce, 1884
 Euchlorostola interrupta Walker, 1856
 Euchlorostola megathyris Hampson, 1914

References

Arctiinae